Henry Andres Rojas Delgado (born July 27, 1987) is a Colombian footballer who currently plays as a midfielder for Cortuluá in the Categoria Primera A.

Career
Rojas started his career in the minor divisions of Deportes Tolima and played there from 2002 to 2004. He was later transferred to Nacional minor divisions on March 30, 2004, and earned a spot on the A Squad in 2006. Rojas debuted as a professional on March 5 of the same year against his old team, Tolima. Later in 2006, he was selected to play in the Colombia national U20 team where he earned his starting spot on the team. On January 31, 2008 Rojas went on loan to Atletico Huila for a year. With his impressive play, Henry received several offers from different team later that year and ultimately decided to play in Manizales, Colombia for Once Caldas. His impact on the team was so great, he led Once Caldas to a Champion in the Copa Mustang. Rojas was once constantly referred to as the leader of the team. In 2010, he moved to Junior. In June 2015, Rojas signed a contract with Bulgarian club Litex Lovech, where he remained until December 2015.

Titles

References

External links

1987 births
Living people
Colombian footballers
Colombian expatriate footballers
Atlético Huila footballers
Deportes Tolima footballers
Atlético Junior footballers
Atlético Nacional footballers
Once Caldas footballers
Alianza Petrolera players
PFC Litex Lovech players
Millonarios F.C. players
Deportivo Pasto footballers
Atlético Bucaramanga footballers
Categoría Primera A players
First Professional Football League (Bulgaria) players
People from Ibagué
Association football midfielders
Colombian expatriate sportspeople in Bulgaria
Expatriate footballers in Bulgaria